was a Japanese hurdler. He competed in the men's 110 metres hurdles at the 1932 Summer Olympics.

References

1908 births
Year of death missing
Place of birth missing
Japanese male hurdlers
Olympic male hurdlers
Olympic athletes of Japan
Athletes (track and field) at the 1932 Summer Olympics
Japan Championships in Athletics winners
20th-century Japanese people